Kurimany is a village and municipality in Levoča District in the Prešov Region of central-eastern Slovakia.

History
In historical records the village was first mentioned in 1298.

Geography
The municipality lies at an altitude of 521 metres and covers an area of  (2020-06-30/-07-01).

Population 
It has a population of 372 people (2020-12-31).

References

External links
https://web.archive.org/web/20070427022352/http://www.statistics.sk/mosmis/eng/run.html

Villages and municipalities in Levoča District